Ivan Linn is a Taiwanese-American entrepreneur, investor, and pianist. He is known for his work in the music production of video games in the Final Fantasy and Kingdom Hearts series. He is also the Music Director and Chief Conductor of the Assassin's Creed Symphony World Tour. Linn is the founder of web3 music platform Wavv. Linn is a member of the National Arts and Sciences Recording Academy and ASCAP.

Early life and education 
Linn started his acting career at four years old, with roles in the popular dramas Justice Pao and the TV show Dream of the Red Chamber. He was also featured in different TV advertisements for companies like McDonald's and Hunya Foods.

Linn was first exposed to music at the age of four, and made his first public piano performance in Switzerland when he was in kindergarten. However, he only started studying piano formally at the age of twelve at Yamaha Music Foundation.

Linn moved to Germany and went to the Hanover University of Music, Drama and Media. In 2011, he moved to the United States to pursue a master's degree in piano performance at the New England Conservatory of Music with a full scholarship. Linn graduated from Yale University in 2015.

Career

Early career 
In 2011, Linn managed the Video Game Orchestra, a philharmonic of symphonic rock fusion based in Boston, MA. The group brought a brand-new music genre to theater and concert hall. He later introduced the orchestra in Asia in 2012 and toured with the group. He was with the Video Game Orchestra for four years.

Linn received a gold medal at the International Edvard Grieg Piano Competition in Oslo and was invited by UNESCO to be featured at the Festival international de la diversité culturelle in Paris as a concert pianist.

He performed with composer Yoko Shimomura, and recorded as a pianist and production manager for Lightning Returns: Final Fantasy XIII and Final Fantasy XV. Linn toured with The Legend of Zelda: Symphony of the Goddesses, Eorzean Symphony Final Fantasy XIV, and Kingdom Hearts World Tour.

Recent Projects 
Linn is the Founder and CEO of Wavv, a web3 music platform co-founded with former Twitter Senior Manager and former Chief Designer of Bahamut in 2017.

Linn was appointed as the music director and Chief Conductor for Ubisoft's Assassin's Creed Symphony World Tour at the end of 2018. Assassin's Creed Symphony premiered with a live performance at E3 2019 that garnered millions of viewers.

In June 2020, Linn recorded live covers for Yoko Shimomura's "Stay at home" virtual concert series. He also produced Shimomura's music for the video game Xuan-Yuan Sword 7 released on October 6, 2020.

Linn composed the score for the Netflix TV series Futmalls.com, released on December, 2020.

In 2021, Linn was the General Manager of Star Ritz International Entertainment Co., Ltd., which was founded by Angie Chai, dubbed the "Godmother of Teen Dramas."

In September of 2022, Linn became the advisor of Filoli, which is also known as the Bourn-Roth Estate, a historic house and garden museum set in 16 acres of formal gardens surrounded by a 654-acre estate, located in Woodside, California.

Discography

Video games

Film

TV

Other projects

Tours

Awards and honours

References

External links
 

Year of birth missing (living people)
Living people
American film score composers
Video game composers
Yale University alumni
American male pianists
21st-century American pianists
American male film score composers
21st-century American male musicians
Taiwanese film score composers
Taiwanese composers
New England Conservatory alumni
Taiwanese conductors (music)
Taiwanese pianists
Taiwanese classical pianists